Armenian paper is a type of incense that has been produced for centuries.  The paper is infused with essences, fragrances or essential oils in order to achieve a perfuming or cleansing effect.  Examples of Armenian paper include Papier d'Arménie, which is produced in France, and Carta Aromatica d'Eritrea, which is produced in Italy. The scents from the French production is "Tradition", "Arménie" and "Rose".

History
At the end of the 19th century, Auguste Ponsot discovered that Armenian households would burn Styrax as a fragrance and disinfectant. Ponsot adopted this habit, and, with the help of the pharmacist Henri Rivier, created his own recipe wherein benzoin resin was dissolved in alcohol then let to soak into blotting paper. The "alchemy" inherent in Papier d'Arménie became a huge success with the emerging importance of hygiene from 1888–1889, and has been steadily produced in Montrouge, France since 1885.
In 2006, during the Year of Armenia in France (Année de l'Arménie en France), the celebrated French perfumer of Armenian origin Francis Kurkdjian gave his own recreation of the historical recipe.

Use

Typically, a strip of Papier d'Arménie is torn from the booklet, folded accordion-style, and placed on a heat-resistant support. The strip is lit and blown on until the paper begins to glow and release the vanilla scent characteristic of resin compounds. The smell is pleasant and subtle, underscoring its primary use as a "purifier". This belief began with the practice of burning Papier d'Arménie on a bell set above a piece of raw meat, which would not rot by the end of a week (as normal meat almost certainly would).

Today Papier d'Arménie is sold primarily as a form of incense or perfume, as a form of candle, or as a form of air freshener; strips tucked between the books of a library will keep the air from turning stale for much longer than a conventional product. Papier d'Arménie is also effective at covering the smell of cigarette smoke and that of animals.

Papier d'Arménie has been found to release benzene and formaldehyde in a study of interior deodorizers conducted by a consumer's union. However the same study shows that of the 72 products tested, Papier d'Arménie presented the lowest rates. Normal use does not present a hazard; it is typical to burn 3 or 4 strips per week, and to air the area regularly.

References

External links
"Papier d'Arménie", Monapart Barcelona, Barcelona, March 25, 2010.
Papier d'Armenie

Incense